Laroque may refer to the following communes in France:

Laroque, Gironde, in the Gironde department 
Laroque, Hérault, in the Hérault department 
Laroque-d'Olmes, in the Ariège department
Laroque-de-Fa, in the Aude department
Laroque-des-Albères, in the Pyrénées-Orientales department
Laroque-des-Arcs, in the Lot department
Laroque-Timbaut, in the Lot-et-Garonne department

See also
 Larroque (disambiguation)
 La Roque (disambiguation)
 Larock (disambiguation)